Passiflora reflexiflora is a species of plant in the family Passifloraceae. It is endemic to Ecuador.

References

Flora of Ecuador
reflexiflora
Near threatened plants
Taxonomy articles created by Polbot
Taxa named by Antonio José Cavanilles